Tunglo (died 839) was a knyaz of the Lusatian Serbs (Sorbs). In May 826, at a meeting at Ingelheim,  of the Obotrites and Tunglo of the Sorbs were accused of malpractice; they were ordered to appear in October, after Tunglo surrendered his son as hostage and was allowed to return home.

References 

839 deaths
Early Sorbian people
9th-century rulers in Europe
9th-century Slavs
Year of birth unknown